The DyBASE is object oriented embedded database for languages with dynamic type checking (REBOL, python, tiscript).  DyBASE for persistence closely resembles client-side persistent data (CSPD) in the Curl web-content language (not to be confused with cURL.) DyBASE is currently used by TIScript as an alternative to JSON.

See also 
 tiscript

External links 
 TIScript home page
 tiscript at code.google
 DyBASE object oriented embedded database for languages with dynamic type checking (Rebol, python, TIScript)

Proprietary database management systems